Rolando Fausto Del Maestro (born 1949) is an Italian-born Canadian neurosurgeon, the William Feindel Professor Emeritus in neuro-oncology and director of the Neurosurgical Simulation Research Center at the Montreal Neurological Institute and Hospital, where he has been involved in mimicking real brain surgery by creating a virtual setting, founded upon the principles of flight simulation.

From 1981 to 2000, as director of the Brain Research Laboratories at the University of Western Ontario, his main work and research focussed on brain tumours, tumour invasiveness and angiogenesis. He also made developments in “awake” brain surgery, where people can respond as the operation progresses. He is a co-founder of the Brain Research Fund Foundation of Canada.

Del Maestro possesses one of the largest private collections of materials related to Leonardo da Vinci, and in 1996 curated an exhibition titled "Leonardo da Vinci; The Search for the Soul".

Del Maestro is married to Pamela. They have three children.

Early life and education
Rolando Del Maestro was born in Borgotaro, Italy, in 1949. In 1967 he gained admission to the University of Western Ontario, from where he received his MD in 1973.

Career

After graduation, he completed five years of junior medical training and neurosurgical residency. In 1979, he received his Ph.D. in the subject of biochemistry from the University of Uppsala, Sweden, where he focused on mechanisms of free radical injury in the small blood vessels. The following year, he received a fellowship in neurosurgery from the Royal College of Physicians and Surgeons of Canada.

From 1981 to 2000, as director of the Brain Research Laboratories at the University of Western Ontario, his main work and research focussed on brain tumours, tumour invasiveness and angiogenesis. In 1991, he was appointed professor of neurosurgery. He moved to the Montreal Neurological Hospital at McGill University Health Centre in 2000. Four years later he gained the William Feindel Professorship in neuro-oncology. He made developments in “awake” brain surgery, where people can respond as the operation progresses, and is the director of the Neurosurgical Simulation Research Center at the Montreal Neurological Institute at McGill University. 

In 2006 he authored a book titled A History of Neuro-Oncology.

Neurosurgical training simulator
Del Maestro has been involved in mimicking real brain surgery by creating a virtual setting, founded upon the principles of flight simulation. In 2020, this was demonstrated in a study published in The Journal of the American Medical Association. The study evaluated how well medical students and surgeons performed in such a setting. The idea came after observing the reduction in fatal aircraft accidents following the global use of simulation in the aviation industry. The adapted simulator, "NeuroVR", developed with the National Research Council of Canada (NRC), allows neurosurgeons to practice brain surgery. He explained how his team “took tumours out and measured their density and then put all that information into the simulator” ... and ... “took colour and put that into the simulator, the way the blood vessels bleed”. The simulator is then able to determine whether the operator is junior or more of an expert, he stated in an interview about the research.

Other roles
In 1982, he co-founded the Brain Research Fund Foundation of Canada, a charity inspired by Steve Northey whose daughter died from a brain tumour. The foundation later became the Brain Tumour Foundation of Canada, which organizes support groups and provides research funds.

Del Maestro and his wife Pam, helped finance "The Pam and Rolando Del Maestro Family William Osler Medical Student Essay Awards", established by the Medical Students’ Osler Society and the Board of Curators of the Osler Library of the History of Medicine.

He retired in 2012.

Awards and honours
Paul Harris Fellowship from Rotary International (1995).
Heroes of Health Care by the National Post and Siemens (2000).
Order of Merit, National Congress of Italian Canadians (2010)

Leonardo da Vinci collection
Del Maestro possesses one of the largest private collections of materials related to Leonardo da Vinci.

In 1996, he curated an exhibition titled 'Leonardo da Vinci; The Search for the Soul'.

Selected publications

Articles

 
 (Joint author)
 (Joint author)
 (Joint author)

Books

References

External links
Google Scholar
Official website

Canadian neurosurgeons
Living people
1949 births
Italian emigrants to Canada
University of Western Ontario alumni
Uppsala University alumni
Fellows of the Royal College of Physicians and Surgeons of Canada
Canadian collectors